The Montreux EP is an extended play (EP) by British soul and pop band Simply Red, released in November 1992. It was recorded live at the Montreux Jazz Festival on 8 July 1992. The EP reached  11 on the UK Singles Chart as well as No. 4 on the Italian Singles Chart and No. 21 on the Irish Singles Chart. It is the only EP the group has released in their career.

Track listing

Charts

Weekly charts

Year-end charts

References

1992 debut EPs
Albums recorded at the Montreux Jazz Festival
East West Records EPs